São José da Tapera is a municipality located in the western of the Brazilian state of Alagoas. Its population was 32,405 (2020) and its area is 520 km².

References

Municipalities in Alagoas